Gallop Racer 2003: A New Breed, known in Japan as , and in Europe as At the Races Presents Gallop Racer, is a horse racing video game developed and published by Tecmo, released in 2002-2003 for the PlayStation 2.

Reception

The game received "average" reviews according to the review aggregation website Metacritic. In Japan, Famitsu gave it a score of 28 out of 40.

References

External links
 

2002 video games
Arcade video games
Horse racing video games
Koei Tecmo franchises
PlayStation 2 games
PlayStation 2-only games
Tecmo games
Video games developed in Japan
Video game sequels
Video games set in 2003